Pompeu Fabra i Poch (Gràcia, Barcelona, 20 February 1868 – Prada de Conflent, 25 December 1948) was a Spanish engineer and grammarian. He was the main author of the normative reform of contemporary Catalan language.

Life
Pompeu Fabra was born in Gràcia, which at that time was still separate from Barcelona, in 1868. He was the last of twelve children born to Josep Fabra i Roca and his wife Carolina Poch i Martí. When Pompeu was six, the family moved to Barcelona.

From a fairly young age Fabra dedicated himself to the study of the Catalan language. Through the journal and publishing house , he participated in a campaign to reform Catalan orthography between 1890–92.

Despite his personal interest in linguistics, Fabra studied industrial engineering in Barcelona and in 1902 accepted a chair of chemistry position at the School of Engineering in Bilbao. During his tenure in Bilbao, Fabra participated actively in the First International Congress of the Catalan Language held in 1906. This event gave him a certain prestige in the field of Catalan linguistics. In 1911, he returned to Barcelona to become a professor (catedràtic) of Catalan — a position created by the diputació (local government) of Barcelona — and a member of the department of philology at the newly created Institut d'Estudis Catalans, of which he would later become president. In 1912 he published his Gramática de la lengua catalana (in Spanish).

The Institute published the Normes ortogràfiques in 1913, the Diccionari ortogràfic in 1917, and its official Gramàtica catalana in 1918. That same year, Fabra also edited the textbook Curs mitjà de gramàtica catalana, published by l'Associació Protectora de l'Ensenyança Catalana. His "Converses filològiques," first published in the newspaper "La Publicitat," were later collected as "Popular Barcino." Probably his most famous work was the Diccionari General de la Llengua Catalana (1932), the first edition of which later became the Institute's official dictionary.

In 1932, owing to his scientific prestige, he was unanimously named a professor (catedràtic) of the Republican Universitat Autònoma de Barcelona (not to be confused with the later Universitat Autònoma de Barcelona created in the 1960s during the Francoist régime). The following year he was named President of the University's governing council, which resulted in his imprisonment in 1934 following the "events of 6 October" when troops of the Second Spanish Republic put down a Catalan government uprising led by Lluis Companys.

Fabra was reinstated to his faculty position after the elections of February 1936, but the Spanish Civil War began in July of that year, and he had to flee his country when Barcelona was being invaded by the Francoist army.  By 1939 he was in exile in France where he endured many hardships. He lived in Paris and Montpellier, where he presided over the Jocs Florals literary competition in 1946. He eventually moved to Prada de Conflent in the Catalan-speaking area of France, where he died on 25 December 1948. At some point during the exile he made his will in Andorra, so that it would be done in a country where Catalan was the official language.

Legacy
Every year, his tomb in the Cuixà monastery near Prada is visited by thousands of Catalans.

The Universitat Pompeu Fabra in Barcelona bears his name.

Books 

 Tractat de ortografia catalana (1904)
 Qüestions de gramàtica catalana (1911)
 La coordinació i la subordinació en els documents de la cancilleria catalana durant el segle XIV (1926)
 Diccionari ortogràfic abreujat (1926)
 La conjugació dels verbs en català (1927)
 Diccionari ortogràfic: precedit d'una exposició de l'ortografia catalana (1931)
 El català literari (1932)

References

Bibliography
 The Architect of Modern Catalan: selected writings /Pompeu Fabra (1868-1948); translation by Alan Yates. Amsterdam: John Benjamins Publishing Co.

External links

Biographical notice by Josep Pla (in Catalan)

1868 births
1948 deaths
People from Barcelona
Linguists from Catalonia
Exiles of the Spanish Civil War in France
Renaixença
Pompeu Fabra University
Linguists of Catalan
Members of the Institute for Catalan Studies
Language reformers
Lexicographers of Catalan
20th-century lexicographers